71 Tauri is a suspected triple star system in the zodiac constellation Taurus, located 146 light years from the Sun. It is visible to the naked eye as a faint, yellow-white hued star with an apparent visual magnitude of +4.48. The star is moving further away from the Earth with a heliocentric radial velocity of +38 km/s. It is a member of the Hyades open cluster.

The primary component is an F-type main-sequence star with a stellar classification of F0 V. It is a Delta Scuti variable with an amplitude of 0.02 in magnitude and a frequency of 0.16 d−1. This star has about 1.94 times the mass of the Sun and 3.34 times the Sun's radius. It has a projected rotational velocity of 192 km s−1, for an estimated rotation period of 14.2 days. Extreme ultraviolet flares have been observed coming from this star's hot corona, and it is the second brightest X-ray source in the Hyades.

References

F-type main-sequence stars
Delta Scuti variables
Triple star systems
Taurus (constellation)
Tauri, V777
Durchmusterung objects
Tauri, 071
028052
020713
1394